Heroshah is an administrative unit, known as Union council, of Malakand District in the Khyber Pakhtunkhwa province of Pakistan.
District Malakand has 2 Tehsils i.e. Swat Ranizai and Sam Ranizai. Each Tehsil comprises certain numbers of Union councils. There are 28 union councils in district Malakand.

See also 

Malakand District
Aamir Sohail Khan  
http://ec   
Aamir Sohail Khan (عامرسہیل خان) is a Pakistani social worker and politician. He was born on 19 April 1989 in union council Heroshah tehsil Dargai district Malakand Khyber Pakhtunkhwa Pakistan. He is a member of Tehsil Council (Naib Nazim) Union council, Heroshah, Chairman at Aamir Sohail Khan Foundation, where its team serving 100 of children every month from Thalassemia and Co-Founder of Heroshah 3.0, Heroshah 3.0 is a social enterprise aimed at building a startup community in district Malakand, Khyber Pakhtunkhwa. The founder of Heroshah 3.0 is Eshan Anas Khan.

External links
Khyber-Pakhtunkhwa Government website section on Lower Dir
United Nations
Hajjinfo.org Uploads
PBS paiman.jsi.com 
Www.aamirsohail.com
Www.heroshah3.org

Malakand District
Populated places in Malakand District
Union councils of Khyber Pakhtunkhwa
Union Councils of Malakand District